The 1956 Pacific hurricane season ran through the summer and fall of 1956. Eleven tropical systems were observed this season.

Systems

Hurricane One

Hurricane One existed from May 18 to May 19.

Tropical Storm Two

Tropical Storm Two existed from May 30 to June 3.

Hurricane Three

Hurricane Three existed from June 9 to June 10.

Hurricane Four

A hurricane hit southern Mexico in June.

Hurricane Five

Hurricane Five existed from July 9 to July 12.

Tropical Storm Six

Tropical Storm Six existed from July 14 to July 16.

Hurricane Seven

Hurricane Seven existed from August 22 to August 25.

Tropical Storm Eight

Tropical Storm Eight existed on September 3.

Hurricane Nine

Hurricane Nine existed from September 4 to September 6.

Hurricane Ten

Hurricane Ten existed from September 12 to September 17.

Tropical Storm Eleven

A tropical storm formed in mid-October.

See also
List of Pacific hurricanes
 Australian region cyclone seasons: 1955–56 1956–57
 South Pacific cyclone seasons: 1955–56 1956–57
 South-West Indian Ocean cyclone seasons: 1955–56 1956–57

References